Geneviève Néron (born 24 July 1974) is a Québécoise actress and musician.

Biography

Career
After studying film and theatre at Cégep de Saint-Jérôme, Néron acted in low-profile stage plays and began to appear on television. She found a broader audience with appearances in the television series Virginie, Tribu.com and Les Invincibles.

Between television appearances, Néron appeared in several films including Les Boys 3, Soowitch and La Moitié gauche du frigo. She was also in the cast of the mini-series Jean Duceppe.

Since 2005 Néron has been touring with her country-rock group, of which she is the lead vocalist and bass guitarist. Their first album, Au nom du countr(i), was released in 2008. She wrote most of the songs for their second album, Génération Passe-Partout, in support of which they toured France.

Néron was part of the environmental project and documentary Vu du large II which examined the health of the St Lawrence River. From 15 September 2007 she co-hosted with Christophe Rapin the travel-journalism competition series Rallye Müvmedia on Télé-Québec.

Néron was set to star in the film Hank est en ville which looked at two western singers trying to bring Hank Williams to Quebec in the 1950s.

Private life
Néron has a daughter named Marianne. Her younger sister, Gabrielle, is also an actress. Gabrielle appeared with Néron in Les Invincibles and managed Madame Moustache's first album tour.

Filmography

Virginie (1996 TV series) – Agathe Sirois
Karaoke (1999) – Genevieve
La Moitié gauche du frigo (2000) – Odile
Soowitch (2001) – Karine
Les Boys 3 (2001) – Chantal
Jean Duceppe (2002 TV miniseries) – Louise Duceppe
Réal-IT (2002 TV series) – Manu
Rumeurs (2004) – Chloe
Les Invincibles (2005 TV series) – Kathleen Samson
Les 7 (2006 musical-comedy) – Jolie Julie
Et Dieu créa... Laflaque (2006) – Voice of Laurence
Niagara (2022) - Lucie

Discography with Madame Moustache
On behalf of the countr(i) (2008)
Génération Passe-Partout (2009, various artists)
Maison mobile (2012)

Tribute
A song called "Geneviève Néron" was written and performed by the Quebec pop punk band Le volume était au maximum, which recorded two versions for their album Filles de l'espace and a single in 2004.

References

1974 births
Living people
French Quebecers
Actresses from Montreal
French-language singers of Canada
Singers from Montreal
Canadian film actresses
Canadian television actresses
21st-century Canadian women singers